Ivy Joe Hunter (born November 16, 1966) is a former professional American football fullback who played   three seasons in the National Football League (NFL) for the Indianapolis Colts and New England Patriots. He played high school football at Buchholz High School in Gainesville, Florida and college football at Kentucky.

Hunter was selected by the Indianapolis Colts in the 7th round of the 1989 NFL Draft, where he played for two years accumulating 100 yards rushing

References

1966 births
Living people
Players of American football from Gainesville, Florida
American football running backs
Buchholz High School alumni
Kentucky Wildcats football players
Indianapolis Colts players
New England Patriots players